The 2014–15 EuroCup Women is the thirteenth edition of FIBA Europe's second-tier international competition for women's basketball clubs under such name. It will be contested by 31 teams from 11 countries and will start on 6 November 2014.

Teams

Pots 
As last season, the participating teams were in a first time divided into two conferences based on geographical criteria.

Group stage 
The draw took place on 6 July 2014 in Munich, Germany. The teams were divided into seven groups of four and one group of three teams each. The top two teams advance to the Eight-Finals.

Group A

Group B

Group C

Group D

Group E

Group F

Group G

Group H

Round of 16

Quarterfinals

Semifinals

Final

References

External links

EuroCup Women seasons
2